Bernard Jąder (born 29 May 1951) is a former international speedway rider from Poland.

Speedway career 
Jąder was the champion of Poland on two occasions, winning the Polish Individual Speedway Championship in 1978 and 1980.

References 

Living people
1951 births
Polish speedway riders